Françoise Hivernel (1943-2022) was a French-born academic archaeologist, psychoanalyst, writer and translator.

Early life
Hivernel was born to Raymonde Beque and André Hivernel in Versailles during World War II. Her brother Jacques Hivernel, was born in 1945.

Education 
Hivernel attended the lycée in Versailles and achieved the Baccalaureat 1st and 2nd part. In 1974. She was awarded an MA and a PhD in 1979 from the UCL Institute of Archaeology in London. She also trained in Contemporary Psychoanalytic Psychotherapy through the West Midlands Institute for Psychotherapy in Birmingham.

Careers
Hivernel worked first as an archaeologist in France where she belonged to the National Scientific Research Centre, Laboratory of Quaternary Geology.  She dug in Ethiopia and Lebanon. Then she went to the UK, whence she dug in Jordan and Kenya. She excavated in Ngenyn, a site initially discovered by Louis Leakey, as part of research towards her PhD. She has also contributed to learned papers on other African archaeological sites and published on the archaeology of Britain.
Subsequently, she worked for Cambridgeshire County Council and next the Cambridge City Council. She then had a career in Psychoanalytic-Psychotherapy.

Writing 
Hivernel wrote extensively on archaeology and psychotherapy and was published in an array of academic journals and books in both French and English. She followed the work of Françoise Dolto and (with F. Sinclair) translated Dolto's seminal book
from French into English. This work brought Dolto to the attention of English-speaking clinicians.

Hivernel published the travel narrative Safartu and substantially contributed to a women's travel anthology 50 Camels and She's Yours. She was a member of Cambridge Writers for some years.

References

1943 births
2022 deaths
British archaeologists
French psychoanalysts
British women archaeologists
French–English translators